Devotion is the eleventh studio album by Christian pop rock band Newsboys, released in November 2004. It is a follow-up album to the band's first worship-oriented project, Adoration. The album debuted at No. 5 on the Top Christian Albums chart, and at No. 56 on the Billboard 200 charts. Several Christian artists made guest appearances on the album, including Rebecca St. James, Bethel World Outreach Choir, Stuart Garrard, and Jon Ellis of Tree63.

The album's artwork includes photography of the band by Jimmy Abegg on a valley floor next to the Natchez Trace Parkway Bridge in Williamson County, Tennessee.  Because of the bridge's unique design which eliminates any spandrel columns, the perspective on many of photographs leverages the non-blocked views of the scenery and sky on the far side of the bridge behind the band.

Track listing

Note
"Isaiah" was originally included as an "album only" track when Devotion was purchased from the iTunes Store. The track has since been deleted from the album and is now available only as a separate single.

Singles 
"Presence (My Heart's Desire)"
"Devotion"
"Blessed Be Your Name"
"Strong Tower"

Personnel 
Newsboys
 Peter Furler – lead vocals, guitars
 Bryan Olesen – lead guitars, vocals
 Jeff Frankenstien – keyboards
 Phil Joel – bass, vocals
 Duncan Phillips – drums, percussion

Additional musicians
 John Ellis – guitars, vocals 
 Stuart Garrard – guitars 
 Rebecca St. James – guest vocals on "Blessed Be Your Name"
 Bethel World Outreach Choir – choir (10)

Production
 Peter Furler – producer
 Wes Campbell – executive producer 
 Steve Taylor – executive producer 
 Joe Baldridge – recording at Bridge Sound Studios, Nashville, Tennessee
 Dan Rudin – recording, mixing at Bridge Sound Studios, Nashville, Tennessee (7)
 Sam Gibson – mixing at Chapel Lane Studios, Hereford, UK (1–6, 8–10)
 Bob Ludwig – mastering at Gateway Mastering, Portland, Maine
 Jan Cook – creative director 
 Benji Peck – art direction, design 
 Jimmy Abegg – photography

References 

Newsboys albums
2004 albums